Sulur is a legislative assembly constituency in the Indian state of Tamil Nadu. Its State Assembly Constituency number is 116. It comprises the Town Panchayat of Irugur, Kannampalayam, Mopperipalayam, Pallapalayam, Samalapuram, Sulur . It also has karumathapatti municipality and Village Panchayat of Sulur Block and Sultanpet Block surrounding areas in Coimbatore. It was formed in 2009 and is part of the Coimbatore parliamentary constituency. It is one of the 234 State Legislative Assembly Constituencies in Tamil Nadu.

Members of the Assembly

Election Results

2021

2019 By-election

2016

2011

1962

1957

References

External links
 

Assembly constituencies of Tamil Nadu